Sam Baines (born 8 February 1991 in Melbourne) is an Australian track and field athlete, specialising in the 110 m Hurdles.

Biography
Baines was born in Melbourne.
He holds the Australian U/18 Record for the 110m Hurdles and also holds the Commonwealth Youth Record. He is coached by James Karageorgiou and competes for the Old Melburnians Athletics Club.

2008

At the III Commonwealth Youth Games in Pune, India he placed 1st in a Commonwealth Youth record time of 13.77s.

He was ranked number 1 in the world for U/18 110m Hurdles.

2010

He competed at the 13th IAAF World Junior Championships in Athletics and placed 4th in the Final.

References

External links
 
 Sam Baines at Australian Athletics Historical Results
 
 
 

1991 births
Living people
Australian male hurdlers
Athletes from Melbourne
Commonwealth Games competitors for Australia
Athletes (track and field) at the 2014 Commonwealth Games
20th-century Australian people
21st-century Australian people